The Third Judicial Circuit of Michigan is the largest circuit court in the state, with 58 judges and three operating divisions. The Third Circuit Court has jurisdiction over civil, criminal, and family matters arising in Wayne County. The National Center for State Courts has cited the Third Circuit Court as one of the model urban courts in the United States for case flow management and the timely disposition of the Court's docket.

Chief Judges

References

External links
 

Circuit courts in the United States
Michigan state courts
Courts and tribunals with year of establishment missing